Jan Holub I (1942-2018) was a speedway rider from the Czech Republic.

Speedway career
Holub was a two times champion of the Czechoslovakia, winning the 1968 and 1969 Czechoslovakian Individual Speedway Championship.

He rode in the top tier of British Speedway riding for Exeter Falcons from 1969 until 1970.

World Final appearances

World Pairs Championship
 1969 -  Stockholm (with Zdeněk Majstr) - 5th - 12pts (8)
 1972 -  Borås  (with Jiří Štancl) - 6th - 12pts (5)
 1974 –  Manchester, Hyde Road (with Jan Hadek) – 7th – 6pts (3)

World Team Cup
 1968 -  London, Wembley Stadium (with Antonín Kasper Sr. / Luboš Tomíček Sr. / Jaroslav Volf) - 4th - 7pts
 1970 -  London, Wembley Stadium (with Zdeněk Majstr / Jiří Štancl / Miloslav Verner / Václav Verner) - 4th - 3pts

References

1942 births
2018 deaths
Czech speedway riders
Exeter Falcons riders
Sportspeople from České Budějovice